Westfield station could refer to:

 Westfield station (Lake Shore and Michigan Southern Railway), a disused train station in Westfield, New York
 Westfield station (NJ Transit), a train station in Westfield, New Jersey
 Westfield station (PAAC), a light rail station in Pittsburgh, Pennsylvania
 Westfield railway station, a disused railway station in Auckland, New Zealand